Edmund Maxwell Cameron Fox, CBE (27 April 1912 – 27 November 1988) was an Australian politician. Born in Melbourne, he was educated at state schools before becoming a clerk and a salesman. He served in the military 1942–45. In 1955, he was elected to the Australian House of Representatives as the Liberal member for Henty. He held the seat until 1974 when he was defeated by Joan Child, the first Labor woman elected to the House. Fox died in 1988.

References

Liberal Party of Australia members of the Parliament of Australia
Members of the Australian House of Representatives for Henty
Members of the Australian House of Representatives
Commanders of the Order of the British Empire
1912 births
1988 deaths
20th-century Australian politicians